Guillaume Guelpa (1850-1930) was a French doctor, born in Italy. He was an important diabetes medical researcher in the days before the invention of insulin in the early 1920s.   During the First World War he invented the medical rack for treatment of all fractures complicated with gangrene.

Works
 - Total pages: 824 
 - Total pages: 4
 - Total pages: 340
 - Total pages: 152 
 - Total pages: 129

Journal articles

Bibliography 
Notes
 

References 
 - Total pages: 608 
 - Total pages: 229 

1850 births
1930 deaths
French diabetologists
French medical writers